Sarah Ann Darling (born October 4, 1982) is an American country music singer and songwriter. She has worked and toured in Nashville, Los Angeles, and the UK, and her last full album release, Wonderland, reached #1 on the official UK Country Charts.

Career
In 2003, Darling made her name first known to the public when she was a top four finalist on E! Entertainment Television's reality show The Entertainer, hosted by Wayne Newton. She missed out on winning the show as Newton believed she was not right for
Las Vegas and he advised her to head to Nashville to focus on country music.

Sarah Darling went into the studio in the summer of 2008 to record her debut album, Every Monday Morning, which was released on June 16, 2009. Her single "Jack of Hearts" successfully made its debut on Country Music Television's top 20 countdown. A second album, Angels & Devils, was released on February 15, 2011, following its lead single "Something to Do With Your Hands" and a digital single release of the U2 cover "With or Without You". To promote the single, Black River Music Group arranged for Darling to sing the national anthem for a Buffalo Sabres game in place of usual singer Doug Allen; the Sabres and Black River are both owned by Terrence Pegula.

In late 2012, a new single titled "Home to Me," was released to digital retailers on August 21, 2012, after being previously featured on Sirius XM's The Highway country-music station. It sold over 8,000 copies in the first week of release becoming the top selling digital single from a new female artist since May 2011 when Lauren Alaina released "Like My Mother Does". "Home to Me" became Darling's first single to chart on the U.S. Billboard Hot Country Songs chart, reaching a peak of number 34. 
"Home To Me" was issued to radio, in multiple versions, customized for different states.

However, after releasing a digital EP, Home to Me, on January 29, 2013, Darling and Black River Entertainment parted ways.

Darling released "Little Umbrellas," independently on June 4, 2013, to digital retailers. It was also issued to country radio on June 24, 2013, though it failed to chart.

Darling has been featured on TBS' CONAN, FOX & Friends, HLN Morning Express with Robin Meade, ABC's The Bachelor, Better TV and many additional news outlets. She wrote the song "Knowing What I Know About Heaven," which was recorded and released by Guy Penrod, and has a passion for baking.

Darling was a contestant on ABC's Rising Star first season in 2014, and was eliminated in the fourth week. However, after her elimination Brad Paisley, one of the show's judges, invited Darling to perform with him at the Grand Ole Opry.

On February 10, 2017, Darling self-released her Dream Country album, a compilation of songs that provided a glimpse into her new musical direction. Dream Country was well received in both the US and UK with over 4 million streams on Spotify and Apple Music.

In 2016, 2017, 2018 and 2019, Darling performed at the C2C: Country to Country festival, the largest country music event in Europe.

On February 20, 2018, Darling teased her new single "Wasted" ahead of an upcoming tour in the UK and Ireland. She performed at the British Summertime Festival in Hyde Park in June 2018 and  

On June 7, 2019, Darling released her newest album Wonderland which climbed to the top of the official UK Country Artist Album Charts. She performed at Nashville Meets London in July, British Country Music Festival in September, and on November 22, 2019, Darling released her single "Divide" featuring Ward Thomas.

Throughout 2020, Darling conducted several concerts over live stream and returned to the live stage in June 2021.

Rising Star

Discography

Studio albums

Extended plays

Singles

Music videos

Tours
Headlining
UK & Ireland Tour (2018)
Wonderland Tour (2019)
2021 Tour (2021)

Supporting
Weekend Roadtrip Tour (2013) with Scotty McCreery

References

External links

Sarah Darling at CMT.com

Living people
Musicians from Des Moines, Iowa
American country singer-songwriters
American women country singers
Black River Entertainment artists
1982 births
Writers from Des Moines, Iowa
Country musicians from Iowa
21st-century American singers
21st-century American women singers
Singer-songwriters from Iowa